Daniele Signore (born 14 July 1971) is an Italian paralympic rower who won a gold medal at the 2008 Summer Paralympics.

References

External links
 

1971 births
Living people
Paralympic rowers of Italy
Paralympic gold medalists for Italy
Medalists at the 2008 Summer Paralympics
Paralympic medalists in rowing
rowers at the 2008 Summer Paralympics